Henry F. Killeen (May 1872 – October 16, 1916) was a starting pitcher in Major League Baseball. He pitched in one game for the Cleveland Spiders of the National League on September 11, 1891. He remained active in the minor leagues through 1899.

External links
Baseball Reference

Cleveland Spiders players
Major League Baseball pitchers
19th-century baseball players
1872 births
Baseball players from New York (state)
1916 deaths
Ottawa Modocs players
Charleston Seagulls players
Grand Rapids Rippers players
Sioux City Cornhuskers players
Toledo White Stockings players
Syracuse Stars (minor league baseball) players
Springfield Ponies players
Derby Angels players
Derby Lushers players